Aami Ashbo Phirey (English: "I shall return") is a 2018 Bengali drama film directed by Anjan Dutt and produced by Shree Venkatesh Films. The film stars Anjan Dutt, Kaushik Sen, Swastika Mukherjee, Anindya Chatterjee, Darshana Banik, Sauraseni Maitra, and Anjana Basu. Dutt collaborated on the music with his son Neel Dutt, who composed the music to his father's lyrics. The film was released on 13 April 2018.

Plot 
The film depicts the stories of four people who deal with pain and violence through music. All the stories are connected by a violent incident. The film also showcases the influence of virtual media on personal life in the modern era.

Cast 
 Anjan Dutt
 Swastika Mukherjee
 Kaushik Sen
 Anjana Basu
Darshana Banik
Sauraseni Maitra
Anindya Chatterjee

Production 
In January 2018, Shree Venkatesh Films announced 25 projects, among them was Aami Ashbo Phirey. Director Anjan Dutt said in an interview that the film was an attempt to "look into my legacy of Bangla cinema, my literature, and tap the mainstream". Dutt collaborated on the music with his son, Neel Dutt, who composed the music to his father's lyrics. The two had previously worked together on a film 11 years earlier. This was also Dutt's second collaboration with Parno Mittra, with whom he had worked in 2011 on Ranjana Ami Ar Ashbona. It was Dutt's first collaboration with Swastika Mukherjee.

Soundtrack 

Dutt has admitted that he always preferred making musical films. The film features "songs of an unknown, unheard young singer/songwriter" which impact the lives of four characters. The Times of India stated that the film's songs give "the feel of classic Anjan [Dutt] songs that once broke stereotypes regularly".

Release and reception 
The official trailer of the film was released on 12 February 2018. The film released on 13 April 2018.

References

External links 

 

Bengali-language Indian films
2010s Bengali-language films
2018 films
Indian drama films
Films directed by Anjan Dutt
2018 drama films